The team dressage in equestrian at the 1988 Olympic Games in Seoul was held at Santa Anita Racetrack.

Competition format

The team medals were awarded after the Grand-Prix portion of the individual competition. After the Grand-Prix portion of the individual event the best three rides of each team were added up and the highest score was the winner. Both the team and the individual competitions ran concurrently.

Results

References

Equestrian at the 1988 Summer Olympics